The following are the national records in speed skating in Argentina maintained by the Argentine Ice Speed Skaters Union (UVEPA).

Men

Women

References

External links
UVEPA website

National records in speed skating
Speed skating
Records
Speed skating-related lists
Speed skating